Indian carp or Indian major carp is a common name for several species of fish:

Catla catla or catla. It is an economically important South Asian freshwater fish of the carp family
Cirrhinus cirrhosus or mrigal, a ray-finned fish of the carp family native to rivers in India
Labeo rohita, the rohu (rui), a fish of the carp family found in rivers in South Asia

See also
Asian carp